The 2019 MTV Video Music Awards were held on August 26, 2019, at the Prudential Center in Newark, being the first VMA ceremony to be held in New Jersey. Sebastian Maniscalco hosted the 36th annual ceremony. Ariana Grande, Taylor Swift, and Billie Eilish were the most awarded with three each. Missy Elliott became the first female rapper to win the Michael Jackson Video Vanguard Award. The show was broadcast on a variety of Viacom-owned networks, as well as their respective websites, and apps through TV Everywhere authentication. 2019 MTV Video Music Awards won the 2020 Webby Award for Events in the category Social.

Performances

Presenters
A variety of presenters appeared at the pre-show and main ceremony.

Pre-show 
Hayley Kiyoko – presented Push Artist of the Year
Terrence J and Nessa (pre-show hosts) and Zara Larsson (pre-show special correspondent) – presented Best K-Pop

Main show
Rick Ross and Pepa – presented Best Hip Hop
Hailee Steinfeld – announced the top two nominees for Best New Artist and presented the award later in the night
Bebe Rexha – introduced Shawn Mendes
Alison Brie and French Montana – presented Best Latin
Megan Thee Stallion – introduced Lizzo
Billy Ray Cyrus – introduced Lil Nas X
Jonathan Van Ness – presented Video for Good
Cardi B – presented the Video Vanguard award
Lindsey Vonn and P. K. Subban – introduced Shawn Mendes and Camila Cabello
Queen Latifah and John Travolta – presented Video of the Year
Lizzo – introduced Miley Cyrus
Keke Palmer – presented Song of the Year
Gigi Hadid and Bella Hadid – introduced Rosalía and Ozuna
Lenny Kravitz – introduced H.E.R. and Normani
Drea de Matteo, Vincent Pastore and Jamie-Lynn Sigler – presented Best Pop
DJ Khaled – introduced Big Sean and ASAP Ferg
Alex Morgan, Ali Krieger and Ashlyn Harris – presented Best Collaboration
Victor Cruz and Adriana Lima – introduced J Balvin and Bad Bunny
Ice-T – introduced Redman, DoItAll, Fetty Wap, Wyclef Jean, Naughty by Nature and Queen Latifah

Winners and nominees
The nominees for most categories were revealed on July 23, 2019. Ariana Grande and Taylor Swift had the most nominations with ten followed by Billie Eilish with nine and Lil Nas X received eight while two new categories were included: Best K-Pop and Video for Good (previously "Video with a Message"). On August 19, three more categories were announced: Best Group, Best Power Anthem, and Song of Summer. The new categories increased the nominations for Grande and Swift to twelve each, Eilish to ten, and Lil Nas X to nine.

Winners are listed first and highlighted in bold.

See also
2019 MTV Europe Music Awards

References

MTV Video Music
MTV Video Music Awards
MTV Video Music Awards
MTV Video Music Awards
MTV Video Music Awards
MTV Video Music Awards ceremonies